WPHZ 102.5 Lite FM is an FM radio station  broadcasting an adult contemporary music format. Licensed to Orleans, Indiana, United States.  The station is currently owned by Mitchell Community Broadcast Company and includes news programming from Fox News Radio.

History
The station was assigned the call sign WOTS on 1988-10-20.  On 1992-06-16, the station changed its call sign to WWEG, on 2004-04-01 to WNUF, on 2005-01-01 to WQRJ, and on 2007-01-01 to the current WPHZ.

On January 1, 2019, WPHZ changed their format from active rock (after a few weeks of Christmas music) to adult contemporary, branded as "Lite FM 102.5". Currently broadcasts Intelligence for Your Life: The John Tesh Radio Show in the mornings, and also the Delilah After Dark Adult contemporary Form at night. All of these are centered around the music they play.

Former shows
Insert Morning Show Title Here
hardDriveXL
Homespun Edge
Racing Rocks
Rockline

Previous logo

References

External links

PHZ
Mainstream adult contemporary radio stations in the United States